Léonie Humbert-Vignot (1878 – 1960) was a French painter.

Life
Humbert-Vignot was born in Lyon in 1878.

From 1896 she exhibited at the Salon in Lyons. She was a student of Marie Laforge, Marcel Baschet, Henri Royer and Édouard Toudouze at the Académie Julian.

Humbert-Vignot died in Lyon in 1960.

References

1878 births
1960 deaths
Artists from Lyon
French women painters